Andrea Stella (fl. 1620s) was an Italian priest and composer.

References

17th-century Italian Roman Catholic priests
Italian Baroque composers
Italian male classical composers